Jonathan Petersen (7 May 1881 – 22 August 1961) was a Greenlandic songwriter. He composed the music to the national anthem of Greenland, Nunarput utoqqarsuanngoravit (Our Country, Who's Become So Old in English). The lyrics were written by the Greenlandic pastor Henrik Lund, and the song was adopted as the national anthem in 1916.

References

1881 births
1961 deaths
Danish composers
Male composers
Danish classical organists
Male classical organists
National anthem writers
20th-century organists
20th-century Danish male musicians